John Deveau is a Canadian politician. He represented the electoral district of Yarmouth in the Nova Scotia House of Assembly from 1998 to 1999. He was a member of the Nova Scotia New Democratic Party.

Deveau is a personal-care worker, who was employed at an adult residential centre before entering provincial politics. Deveau defeated incumbent Richie Hubbard and former MLA Alex McIntosh to win the Yarmouth riding for the NDP in the 1998 provincial election, becoming the first New Democrat to ever win a seat in western Nova Scotia.  As MLA, he was the NDP critic for Fisheries and Aquaculture. He was defeated by Progressive Conservative Richard Hurlburt when he ran for re-election in 1999.

Deveau attempted to win back the seat in the 2006 election, but was again defeated by Hurlburt. In 2010, Hurlburt resigned as MLA, and Deveau won the NDP nomination for the by-election held to replace him. Deveau's attempt to win a seat in the NDP government was unsuccessful, as Zach Churchill won the seat for the Liberals. Deveau finished the by-election in fourth place, winning 6.5% of the vote.

References

Living people
Nova Scotia New Democratic Party MLAs
People from Yarmouth, Nova Scotia
Year of birth missing (living people)
Acadian people